Mallikarjuna is a 2011 Kannada film in the action genre starring V. Ravichandran and Sadha in the lead roles . The film has been directed and written by director Murali Mohan and produced by S. Dinesh Gandhi . S. A. Rajkumar has composed the soundtrack and  the background score. The film is slated for release in May 2011. The film is remake of the 2001 Tamil film Thavasi starring Vijaykanth and Soundarya.

Cast
 V. Ravichandran as Mallikarjuna / Surya
 Sadha as Priya
 Seetha
 Ramya Barna as Nandini 
 Hema Choudhary as Savithramma
 Ashish Vidyarthi as Vishakanta 
 Ramesh Bhat
 M. N. Lakshmi Devi
 Adhi Lokesh
 Bullet Prakash
 Raju Talikote

Soundtrack
S. A. Rajkumar has composed the music for the film.

Reception

Critical response 

A critic from The Times of India scored the film at 3 out of 5 stars and says "WhileRavichandran as Surya looks smart, his role as Mallikarjuna is less impressive with silly make-up. Sada is okay. Ramesh Bhat impresses. Cinematography by G S V Seetharam and music by S A Rajkumar are average". A critic from The New Indian Express wrote "Music director SA Rajkumar has done a neat job. Cinematographer Seetharam has also worked well behind the camera. It is worth watching if you are capable of coping up with this stale script and meaningless stunt sequences". A critic from Bangalore Mirror wrote  "The story has some stale jokes (remember the original is 10 years old) and even older situations. A lot was expected, but music director SA Rajkumar comes out with average numbers. It is high time filmmakers tried out something different, instead of churning out remakes".

References

2010s Kannada-language films
Kannada remakes of Tamil films